Deodápolis is a municipality located in the Brazilian state of Mato Grosso do Sul. Its population was 12,984 (2020) and its area is 831 km2.

References

Municipalities in Mato Grosso do Sul